Arthur Cazaux was the defending champion but lost in the final to Sho Shimabukuro.

Shimabukuro won the title after defeating Cazaux 6–2, 7–5 in the final.

Seeds

Draw

Finals

Top half

Bottom half

References

External links
Main draw
Qualifying draw

Nonthaburi Challenger III - 1